Xunwu County is a county in the far south of Jiangxi province, People's Republic of China, bordering the provinces of Fujian to the east and Guangdong to the south. It is under the administration of the prefecture-level city of Ganzhou.

It was the focus of Mao Zedong's 1930 essay Report from Xunwu which surveyed conditions in the region and related them to Mao's developing theory of Chinese communism.

Administrative divisions
Xunwu County has 7 towns and 8 townships. 
7 towns

8 townships

Climate

References

Ganzhou
County-level divisions of Jiangxi